The 2013–14 Saudi Professional League (known as the Abdul Latif Jameel Professional League for sponsorship reasons) was the 38th season of the Saudi Professional League, the top Saudi professional league for association football clubs, since its establishment in 1976. The season began on 23 August 2013 and ended on 6 April 2014. Al-Fateh were the defending champions having won their first title last season. The league was contested by the 12 teams from the 2012–13 season as well as Al-Nahda and Al-Orobah, who joined as the promoted clubs from the 2012–13 First Division. They replace Al-Wehda and Hajer who were relegated to the 2013–14 First Division.

On 28 March, Al-Nassr secured their sixth league title with one game to spare after a 1–1 draw away to Al-Shabab. This was Al-Nassr's first league title since the 1994–95 season.

Al-Nahda were the first team to be relegated following a 2–2 home draw with Al-Orobah on 22 March. Al-Ettifaq became the second and final team to be relegated following a 2–1 defeat away to Al-Ahli on the final matchday. Al-Ettifaq were relegated for the first time in history after 37 consecutive seasons in the top flight.

Name sponsorship
On 14 April 2013, it was that the Abdul Latif Jameel group had signed a six-year sponsorship contract with the SAFF. Starting from the 2013–14 season, the league would be known as the Abdul Latif Jameel Professional League. It was later announced that the sponsorship deal cost SAR720 million in total, SAR120 million a year. The previous sponsor, Zain, opted not to renew their contract following its expiration.

Teams
Fourteen teams competed in the league – the twelve teams from the previous season and the two teams promoted from the First Division. The promoted teams were Al-Orobah (playing in the top flight for the first time ever) and Al-Nahda (returning to the top flight after nineteen years). They replaced Hajer (ending their two-year top-flight spell) and Al-Wehda (who were relegated after one season in the top flight).

Stadiums and locations

Note: Table lists in alphabetical order.

Personnel and kits 

 1 On the back of the strip.
 2 On the right sleeve of the strip.

Managerial changes

Foreign players
The number of foreign players is restricted to four per team, including a slot for a player from AFC countries.

Players name in bold indicates the player is registered during the mid-season transfer window.

 Imad Khalili has Palestinian citizenship and was counted as an Asian player.

League table

Results

Season statistics

Scoring

Top scorers

Hat-tricks 

Notes
(H) – Home; (A) – Away4 Player scored 4 goals

Most assists

Clean sheets

Discipline

Player 
 Most yellow cards: 11
 Omar Hawsawi (Al-Nassr)

 Most red cards: 2
 Issoumaila Dao (Al-Raed)
 Fernando Menegazzo (Al-Shabab)

Club 
 Most yellow cards: 58
 Al-Nahda

 Most red cards: 6
 Al-Ahli

Attendances

By team

†

†

References

Saudi Professional League seasons
Saudi Professional League
Professional League